Golmaal 3 is a 2010 Indian Hindi-language action comedy film directed by Rohit Shetty and the third film in the Golmaal series. The film contains an ensemble cast starring Ajay Devgn, Arshad Warsi, Mithun Chakraborty, Kareena Kapoor, Tusshar Kapoor, Shreyas Talpade, Kunal Khemu, Ratna Pathak Shah, and Johnny Lever. The storyline is partially inspired by Basu Chatterjee's 1978 film Khatta Meetha which itself was based on the 1968 film Yours, Mine and Ours.

Golmaal 3 was released on 5 November 2010, coinciding with Diwali. The film received mixed reviews, with praise for its humour and performances but criticism for its repetitive jokes and narrative. The film was ranked as the second highest-grossing film of 2010 in India after Dabangg and third worldwide behind Dabangg and My Name Is Khan.

Golmaal 3 was later remade in Telugu as Pandavulu Pandavulu Tummada (2014). A fourth film in the series, Golmaal Again was released in 2017.

Plot
The story follows Pritam, an elderly bus driver. His three good-for-nothing sons, Madhav, the group leader; Laxman, the poetic idiot; and Lucky, the innocent mute, are always up to trouble, mostly by scamming people. On the other hand, Geeta is an elderly woman whose two sons, Laxman, the stammerer; and Gopal, the strong but kind leader; own a water sports stall at the beach. Gopal and Laxman's partner is Daboo, on whom Gopal has a crush but never shows it.

Three robbers Pappi, Daga and Teja rob the queen's necklace and are on the run from the police, they end up in Goa. Pappi, the don, who suffers from short-term memory, hides the necklace in Pritam's house. Soon enough, Pritam's sons open a water sports shack opposite Geeta's sons' stall, and a rivalry begins. Filled with mayhem, both groups try to take down each other's businesses but fail hilariously. In response to this, Pritam goes to meet Geeta (unaware that they are Geeta's sons) to sort out this rivalry and learns that Geeta is his college sweetheart. Daboo overhears their love story and decides to get the two married, without their sons' permission.

After the marriage, the two families start living in one house, filled with non-stop laughter and mayhem. After being overheard by Lucky, it is also revealed to the five sons that they are not Pritam and Geeta's sons, but orphans. The boys vow not to tell the couple that they know they are orphans, and to hide that, they become friendly like brothers. They also open a large toy store with the help of Vasooli Bhai (another not-a-don don) and Pappi for money. Pappi, along with his goons Daga and Teja, eventually remembers where he hid the necklace and turns himself in. Pritam finds the necklace after the long squabble, chase, and mayhem and arrests Pappi and his goons after Gopal and Daboo trick him into revealing the location of the hidden necklace. Pritam and Geeta are going on their honeymoon while Gopal, Madhav, Lucky, and the two Laxmans end up brawling after an argument.

During the argument, Daboo tries to stop them, but they don't. The film ends with Daboo pulling the director of the film Rohit Shetty and other crew members to stop their argument. The whole cast and crew enter the frame to stop them together, which itself creates chaos.

Cast

Ajay Devgn as Gopal "Gopu" 
Arshad Warsi as Madhav 
Kareena Kapoor as Divya "Dabboo"
Mithun Chakraborty as Pritam "Pappu" 
Tusshar Kapoor as Lucky 
Kunal Khemu as Laxman 1
Shreyas Talpade as Laxman 2
Ratna Pathak Shah as Geeta "Guddi" 
Murali Sharma as Inspector Dande
Johnny Lever as Pappi Bhai
Mukesh Tiwari as Vasooli Bhai
Ashwini Kalsekar as Chintu
Sanjay Mishra as Dagga Singh
Vrajesh Hirjee as Teja
Vijay Patkar as Havaldar Gandhari
Jeetu Verma as Raghubir
Rohit Shetty as himself
Prem Chopra as himself
Viju Khote as Shambhu Kaka

Soundtrack  

The soundtrack was composed by Pritam and lyrics were written by Kumaar.

Reception

Critical reception
On the review-aggregation website Mirchiplex.com, the film was scored 2/5 based on 12 reviews. Mayank Shekhar of Hindustan Times rated it 1.5/5 and noted that "the filmmakers have six main actors to juggle with, and as many side comedians to lend parts to. Never mind the narrative, they would be happy with as any corny antics and dialogues with whoever was available." Raja Sen of Rediff.com gave a similar rating explaining that "[he] was not looking for sensitivity or smarts in Golmaal 3 [but for]... a few good jokes. [However], the film does not oblige." On the other hand, critic Taran Adarsh of Bollywood Hungama rated it 4/5, concluding that "Golmaal 3 is an ideal fun ride with thrice the enjoyment and gratification, thrice the magic and thrice the hilarity." The Times of India explained that "[although] the comic acts get repetitive...there is a laugh riot waiting for you at the multiplex this weekend." Vinayak Chakravorty of Mail Today gave it 3 stars out of 5.

Indian Stammering Association criticism
The Indian Stammering Association (TISA), based in Dehradun, started an online petition to the censor board against the comical depiction of stuttering, a disabling disorder that affects millions of children and many adults.

In October 2010 TISA filed a public interest writ petition against the director and producers of the film Golmaal 3 and the censor board of India at Uttarakhand High Court. It objected to the film's portrayal of stammerers as objects of ridicule, on the grounds that this promoted discrimination and the teasing and bullying of people who stammer. The film-makers and Censor Board were to respond to the court notice by 14 December 2010. After that, the court was to hear this case.

Box office
Golmaal 3 released in India and internationally on 5 November 2010 to coincide with the Diwali weekend, usually considered a profitable time of the year. The film's opening collections on the first day reached  83 million and opening weekend net collections stood at  335 million. Opening week gross collections were around  622.5 million in India and  100 million overseas.

The film had a strong second weekend in theatres, grossing  190 million. During its second and third week at the Indian box office, the film grossed  317.5 million and  90 million respectively, therefore increasing the film's total to  1075.6 million. Meanwhile, the film earned $1,132,192 in United States and Canada, £638,496 in UK and $352,063 in Australia. Golmaal 3 became the second highest-grossing Bollywood film of 2010.

Awards and nominations

Trivia
 In this film, Kareena Kapoor Khan's character's petname is Daboo. In real life, Daboo is her father, Randhir Kapoor's petname.
 Kunal Khemu's character "Laxman 2" hilarious way of speaking phrases in poetic rhythms brought him recognition and he was loved by the audience for his excellent comic timing, which he had also shown in Dhol, 99, Go Goa Gone & Golmaal Again.

Sequel
The fourth installment in the series, Golmaal Again, was released on 20 October 2017. The sequel stars Ajay Devgan, Arshad Warsi, Tushar Kapoor, Shreyas Talpade and Kunal Khemu reprising their roles while Parineeti Chopra and Tabu play the female leads. Rohit Shetty announced on 14 July 2016 that Golmaal Again was releasing on 20 October 2017.

References

External links
 
 
 
 

2010 films
2010s Hindi-language films
2010 action comedy films
2010s buddy comedy films
Films scored by Bappi Lahiri
Films directed by Rohit Shetty
Films featuring songs by Pritam
Films shot in Goa
Films set in Goa
Indian action comedy films
Indian buddy films
Indian sequel films
Films scored by Sanjoy Chowdhury
Hindi films remade in other languages
2010 comedy films